Morocco competed at the 2012 Winter Youth Olympics in Innsbruck, Austria. The Moroccan team was made up of one athlete, a Canadian born alpine skier.

Medalists

Alpine skiing

Morocco has qualified one boy in alpine skiing.

Boy

See also
Morocco at the 2012 Summer Olympics

References

Nations at the 2012 Winter Youth Olympics
2012 in Moroccan sport
Morocco at the Youth Olympics